Goose Cove, also known as North Harbour, is a settlement in Newfoundland and Labrador.

Populated places in Newfoundland and Labrador